Muene "Mamissa" Tshijuka (born 12 May 1973) is a Congolese basketball player. She competed in the women's tournament at the 1996 Summer Olympics. The third of four children, she grew up playing handball in school until a coach recommended she try basketball. She committed to play college basketball for Old Dominion in 1998, transferring to Nebraska–Kearney in 2000.

Her daughter, Ndjakalenga Mwenetanda, committed to play college basketball for the Texas Longhorns.

References

External links
 

1973 births
Living people
Democratic Republic of the Congo women's basketball players
Olympic basketball players of the Democratic Republic of the Congo
Basketball players at the 1996 Summer Olympics
Old Dominion Monarchs women's basketball players
Nebraska–Kearney Lopers women's basketball players
People from Lubumbashi